Chalanaka Weerasinghe (born 27 April 1994) is a Sri Lankan cricketer. He made his List A debut for Monaragala District in the 2016–17 Districts One Day Tournament on 26 March 2017.

References

External links
 

1994 births
Living people
Sri Lankan cricketers
Monaragala District cricketers
People from Matara, Sri Lanka